Kentucky Route 500 (KY 500) is a  state highway in Kentucky. KY 500's southern terminus is at KY 56 in Saint Joseph, and the northern terminus is at the end of state maintenance in Curdsville

Major intersections

References

0500
Transportation in Daviess County, Kentucky